Raymond Robert "Gaumey" Neal (November 1, 1897 – November 25, 1977) was an American football coach and player. He served as the head coach for the DePauw Tigers at DePauw University for 16 seasons. Prior to that, he played four seasons in the National Football League (NFL) with the Akron Pros and the Hammond Pros.

Biography
Neal was born on November 1, 1897 in Mellott, Indiana. He attended Mellott High School and Wingate High School. Neal attended Washington & Jefferson College, where he played in the 1922 Rose Bowl, before transferring to Wabash College where he served as the football team captain. He graduated from Wabash in 1920.

Neal played four seasons in the National Football League. In 1922, he played for the Akron Pros, where he saw action in ten games, including six starts. From 1924 to 1926, Neal played for the Hammond Pros. He started five games each in 1924 and 1925, and in the latter, recovered one fumble that he returned for a touchdown. He started in two games in 1926.

In 1930, Neal was hired as the head football coach at DePauw University. He coached the 1933 team to an undefeated, untied, and unscored upon season. The Tigers outscored their opponents, 136–0, and finished the season with a 7–0 record. In 1946, he resigned as coach to become DePauw's athletic director and Department of Physical Education chairman. He retired from that position in 1954 and became the postmaster of Greencastle, Indiana. Neal died in 1977. He was inducted into the Indiana Football Hall of Fame in 1977, the Wabash College Athletic Hall of Fame in 1984, and the DePauw Athletic Hall of Fame as a coach in 1986.

Head coaching record

References

External links
 

1897 births
1977 deaths
American football ends
American football guards
American football tackles
Akron Pros players
DePauw Tigers athletic directors
DePauw Tigers football coaches
Hammond Pros players
Washington & Jefferson Presidents football players
Wabash Little Giants football players
People from Fountain County, Indiana
Coaches of American football from Indiana
Players of American football from Indiana